{{DISPLAYTITLE:Theta2 Orionis}}

Theta2 Orionis (θ2 Ori) is a multiple star system in the constellation Orion.  It is a few arc minutes from its more famous neighbour the Trapezium Cluster, also known as θ1 Orionis.

Components

θ2 Orionis consists of three stars in a line, each about an arc-minute from the next.  In addition to the well-known three stars, the Washington Double Star Catalog confusingly lists a component D which is actually θ1 Orionis C.

There is one other star brighter than 10th magnitude in the region.  V1073 Orionis is a B9.5 Orion variable that forms an equilateral triangle with θ2 Ori B and C.

Bizarrely, θ2 Orionis C has a second entry in the Washington Double Star Catalog under the name S490.  The companion is 10th magnitude and actually lies between θ2 Ori B and V1073 Ori.

θ1 Orionis, the well known Trapezium cluster, is only 2 arc minutes away from θ2 Orionis A.  Despite the names, θ2 Orionis A is marginally brighter than the brightest star in the Trapezium.  The Catalog of Components of Double and Multiple Stars includes the stars of θ1 and θ2 Ori within the same system of 13 components.

There are dozens of much fainter stars in the same field, many of them pre-main-sequence stars still forming from the Orion molecular cloud complex.

Properties
The primary component A appears as a 5th magnitude O class subgiant over 100,000 times as luminous as the sun.  The spectral type suggests it is evolving away from the main sequence, although it is thought to be less than 2 million years old.  The spectral peculiarities may be related to close companions or could be caused by the extreme youth of the star.

The 6th magnitude component B is an early B main sequence star nearly 30,000 K and over 10,000 times the luminosity of the sun.

Component C is another B class main sequence star, but cooler and less than a thousand times the luminosity of the sun.

θ2 Orionis A system
θ2 Orionis A is itself a triple star system.  Its spectral lines were seen to change position periodically, indicating orbital motion.  The first orbit was derived in 1924, indicating a period of 21 days. and a rather eccentric orbit.

Speckle interferometry has resolved a companion about 0.3" away, around 147 AU. High resolution spectroscopy shows that there is an even closer companion, only about 0.47 AU from the primary, for a total of three stars. This helps to explain the high mass and visual luminosity for an O9.5 star at this distance. The three stars together have nearly the same mass as the O5.5 θ1 Orionis C and visually are even brighter.

θ2 Orionis A also shows unexplained rapidly variable x-ray emission.  The x-rays cannot be explained standard mechanisms such as colliding winds or coronal emissions from an unseen companion.

References

Orion (constellation)
B-type main-sequence stars
Orionis, Theta2
O-type subgiants
Orion variables
3
026235
1897
037041
Durchmusterung objects
Orionis, 43
Orionis, V361